Jagadeka Veerudu Athiloka Sundari, also known by the initialism JVAS, is a 1990 Indian Telugu-language fantasy film directed by K. Raghavendra Rao who co-wrote the script with Jandhyala and Yandamuri Veerendranath. The film stars Chiranjeevi and Sridevi while Amrish Puri, Kannada Prabhakar, Allu Ramalingaiah and Rami Reddy play supporting roles. The film is produced by C. Aswani Dutt on Vyjayanthi Movies banner. The plot revolves around a man who finds a ring that gives the bearer great power, but the goddess who lost the ring seeks it back to return to her world.

Jagadeka Veerudu Athiloka Sundari was theatrically released on May 9, 1990. The film upon release was a massive success, grossing ₹15 crore at the box office and becoming the highest grossing Telugu film in history at the time. It is regarded as a classic film in fantasy genre in Telugu cinema. The film won five state Nandi Awards.

Plot
Raju, a courageous and spirited young man, is a caregiver to four young orphans. He is a tourist guide in a picturesque hill station. One of the children is accidentally injured. An ayurvedic guru suggests the only cure for the child's injury - herbs found only on the banks of Lake Manasarovar. Raju goes to the Himalayas to retrieve these powerful herbs. During the same time, a celestial being, Indraja, the daughter of Lord Indra, happens to visit  Manasarovar. She accidentally drops her ring there. This ring is her passport to Heaven. Raju finds the ring and starts wearing it, oblivious to its divine power. Indraja is unable to enter Heaven as she lost her ring. Brihaspathi, the Deva-guru, instructs her to go back to Earth to retrieve it before the next Kartik Poornima.

In search of the ring, Indraja finds her way to Raju's hometown. Due to her strange language and lack of emotional and social awareness, she is initially considered insane. Her umpteen confessions about her divinity are subject to laughter. Raju and the children take pity on her and provide her shelter in their home. She becomes close to the children and often ends up in trouble trying to take the ring from Raju.

In the meanwhile, Raju is caught up in a moral squabble with KP, an arrogant millionaire. KP's goons launch a series of attacks on Raju and Indraja. Raju overcomes them, unaware that the ring is helping him. KP gets suspicious about Raju's supernatural power. KP approaches Mahadrashta, a sorcerer who sacrifices women to attain his powers. Mahadrashta discovers that Indraja is a celestial being and wants to sacrifice her to become immortal.

The kids take Indraja on a car ride one day, and the car loses control. Raju averts a major accident and blames and abandons Indraja. The youngest of the orphans is critically injured when Mahadrashta's men bomb the school. When everyone's asleep, Indraja puts on the divine ring and saves the child. Raju realises Indraja's true self and repents for his folly. The two realize that they have fallen in love.

Raju uses the ring's power to scare K. P. and his goons. During this time, Mahadrashta tries to acquire it from one of the kids by hypnotizing her. A monkey grabs the ring and carries it far away, dropping it in the bowl of Kumkuma at the feet of a statue of Hanuman. Raju and the kids search for the ring in vain.

Mahadrashta and his men plant false evidence in Raju's home to fabricate the lie that Indraja is a sorceress. Raju and Indraja are pelted with stones, and Indraja is carried away by Mahadrashta. The kids discover the ring, and Raju sets out to save Indraja. A hypnotized Indraja does not recognize or respond to their calls. Upon coming in contact with the ring, she comes to her senses and destroys K. P. and his men. Raju kills Mahadrashta, refusing to use the ring, as he believes human power is enough to defeat evil.

The very same evening is Kartik Poornima, the final call for Indraja to return to heaven. Her thoughts are flooded with the loving memories of her time with Raju and the kids. She is caught between her love for Raju and her obligation to return to heaven to remain divine and immortal. Indraja throws away her ring and chooses to go back to Raju to lead a mortal life.

Cast

 Chiranjeevi as Raju, a hill station tour guide
 Sridevi as Indraja, the daughter of Lord Indra who hails from the celestial realm of Indraloka
 Amrish Puri as Mahadrashtha, a sorcerer who practices black magic
 Kannada Prabhakar as KP
 Allu Ramalingaiah as Ganga Jalam
 Rami Reddy as Abbulu
 Tanikella Bharani as Dasu
 Brahmanandam as Vichitra Kumar
 Prasad Babu as Narada
 Janagaraj as the police inspector
 Sangeeta as Teacher
 Master Richard as Orphan
 Baby Shalini as Orphan
 Baby Shamili as Orphan
 P. J. Sharma as Sage
 R. S. Shivaji as Malokam
 Crazy Mohan

Production

Development 
Writer Srinivas Chakravati shared the idea of a story with Raghavendra Rao, where the daughter of Indra who comes to Earth loses her ring without which she cannot return to Indraloka. Raghavendra Rao liked the story and following a series of meetings and story discussion sessions with writer Yandamoori Veerendranath, Jandhyala, Satyanand and Crazy Mohan, developed it into a socio-fantasy drama. Chiranjeevi spent almost 25 days with the writing team.

Initially, it was decided that the protagonist Raju goes to the moon in a rocket and meets goddess Indraja there. Since the barren surface of the moon would not be suitable for song picturization the idea was dropped. Then Chiranjeevi suggested the backdrop of Manasarovar, where Indraja lands and Raju goes to bring the magical herb that would heal the injured leg of the little girl. It was liked by all and was immediately approved.

Aswani Dutt recalls being fascinated by the socio-fantasy films made by the Vijaya Studios, especially Jagadeka Veeruni Katha (1961) which was an inspiration for him to produce this film.

Filming 
The film marked the first collaboration between frequent collaborators, Aswani Dutt and Chiranjeevi. A massive set was raised at Vijaya Vauhini Studios in Madras for the film, which producer Dutt claimed was "perhaps the biggest set ever for a Telugu film, after Prema Nagar." This is the third time Chiranjeevi and Sridevi paired in a film and also the first film to be broadcast as onscreen pair. Three of the child actors in the film, Shalini, Richard Rishi, and Shamili are siblings in real life.

The song "Abba nee Thiyyani Debba" was choreographed by Sundaram. Cinematographer Ajay Vincent used polythene sheets smeared with vaseline to replicate the snow-filled hills of Manasarovar for the song "Andhaalalo Mahodayam". Chiranjeevi shot the song "Dhinakkuthaa Kasakkuro" despite suffering from fever with a body temperature of 104 degrees Fahrenheit. He sponged his body with ice and completed the shoot, allowing Sridevi to fly abroad for another shoot. Amrish Puri dubbed for himself in Telugu for the role of the sorcerer, Mahadrashta.

Music 
The soundtrack was composed by Ilaiyaraaja and all songs are written by Veturi. "Yamaho" was a remake from Ilaiyaraaja's own "Madurai Marikozhundhu" from the Tamil movie Enga Ooru Pattukaran (1987). The song "Abbanee Teeyani" went on to be reused in Hindi as "Dhak Dhak Karne Laga" in the film Beta (1992). The Music Rights of the film were acquired by Aditya Music. The film's songs composed by Ilaiyaraaja were instant chartbusters.

 Telugu (original) tracklist

 Hindi (dubbed) (Aadmi Aur Apsara) tracklist

Reception
The film had 100-day runs in a number of theaters and a 200-day run in one centre, it collected over more than 11 crore at the box office and broke it all the records which were set up by past movies and became a blockbuster. This film's box office performance was undeterred by the floods raging then united Andhra Pradesh.

The film was subsequently dubbed in Hindi as Aadmi Aur Apsara, in Tamil as Kaadhal Devathai, and in Malayalam as Hai Sundari.

Legacy 
Jagadeka Veerudu Athiloka Sundari is regarded as a classic film in fantasy genre in Telugu cinema.

Hemanth Kumar CR writing for Vogue India in February 2020 noted, "The dazzling chemistry of the lead actors, along with Ilaiyaraaja’s chart-busting music, and the epic nature of the film propelled it into one of the biggest hits of all time." Further, he listed the film among the seven Telugu films to watch for fans of fantasy genre.

Karthik Keramalu writing for Film Companion in July 2021 noted, "This is a bloody entertaining fantasy drama that has everything in equal measure – over the top action sequences, a sorcerer as the villain, a goddess in the form of Sridevi, a heartthrob with the face of Chiranjeevi, a finger ring that possesses magical powers, and amazing songs by Ilaiyaraaja. This is a lethal combination that today's movies do not have the temerity to fight against."

Awards
Filmfare Awards South
 Filmfare Award for Best Director – Telugu – K. Raghavendra Rao (1990)

Nandi Awards
 Best Music Director – Ilaiyaraaja
 Best Audiographer - A. R. Swaminadhan  
 Best Costume Designer - M. Krishna
 Best Art Director - B. Chalam
 Best Choreographer - Sundaram Master

Sequel 
In May 2020, producer Dutt stated that a sequel is already on the cards, which would be about the offspring of Indraja and Raju. Over speculations that Ram Charan and Janhvi Kapoor (son and daughter of Chiranjeevi and Sridevi respectively) are being considered, Dutt responded by saying, "it'll be wonderful if it can happen."

References

External links
 

1990 films
1990s fantasy action films
Films based on Indian folklore
Films directed by K. Raghavendra Rao
Hindu mythological films
Indian fantasy action films
1990s Telugu-language films
Films scored by Ilaiyaraaja